A Farewell to Arms is a 1929 semi-autobiographical novel by Ernest Hemingway.

A Farewell to Arms may also refer to:

Adaptations of the novel
 A Farewell to Arms (play), a 1930 stage adaptation by Laurence Stallings
 A Farewell to Arms (1932 film), a film adaptation directed by Frank Borzage starring Gary Cooper
 A Farewell to Arms (1957 film), a film adaptation directed by Charles Vidor
 A Farewell to Arms (TV series), a 1966 British TV miniseries

Poetry

 A Farewell to Arms (poem), a 1590 poem by George Peele

Other uses
 A Farewell to Arms (album), a 2010 album by the Norwegian hard rock band TNT
 A Farewell to Arms (Futurama), an episode from the TV series Futurama
 "A Farewell to Arms", the title of the final content update for Enter the Gungeon
 "A Farewell to Arms", a song by Machine Head from the 2007 album The Blackening